

Canadian Football News in 1932
The Calgary Altomah-Tigers became the Altomahs.

The Regina Roughriders made history by playing in their fifth consecutive Grey Cup game. It was a record that would last 50 years, only surpassed by the 1977-1982 Edmonton Eskimos. It also marked the fifth straight defeat at the Grey Cup. The Hamilton Tigers took home their third Grey Cup in five years.

Regular season

Final regular season standings
Note: GP = Games Played, W = Wins, L = Losses, T = Ties, PF = Points For, PA = Points Against, Pts = Points
*Bold text means that they have clinched the playoffs.
* The Garrison team defaulted one game to each of the Winnipegs and St.John's

* Quakers defaulted final game of season to Varsity

League Champions

Grey Cup playoffs
Note: All dates in 1932

SRFU Tie-Breaker

Regina advances to the MB/SK semifinal against the Winnipeg St.John's.

Semifinals

Hamilton advances to the East Final.

Calgary won the total-point series by 11–10. Calgary advances to the Western Final.

Regina advances to the Western Final.

Finals

Hamilton advances to the Grey Cup game.

Regina advances to the Grey Cup game.

Playoff bracket

Grey Cup Championship

1932 Eastern (Combined IRFU & ORFU) All-Stars  selected by Canadian Press
NOTE: During this time most players played both ways, so the All-Star selections do not distinguish between some offensive and defensive positions.
FW - Don Young, McGill University
HB - Frank Turville, Hamilton Tigers
HB - Gord Perry, Montreal AAA Winged Wheelers
HB - Wally Masters, Ottawa Rough Riders
QB - Hal Baysinger, Montreal AAA Winged Wheelers
C  - Lou Newton, Montreal AAA Winged Wheelers
G  - Alex Denman, Hamilton Tigers
G  - Pete Jotkus, Montreal AAA Winged Wheelers
T  - Brian Timmis, Hamilton Tigers
T  - Dave Sprague, Hamilton Tigers
E  - Jimmy Keith, Toronto Argonauts
E  - Henri Garbarino, Montreal AAA Winged Wheelers
Coach - Frank Shaughnessy, McGill University

NOTE: This was the first Canadian Press eastern all-star selection.

1932 Canadian Football Awards
 Jeff Russel Memorial Trophy (IRFU MVP) – Alex Denman (OG), Hamilton Tigers

References

 
Canadian Football League seasons